Overtoun Park is a public park in Rutherglen, South Lanarkshire, Scotland.

Located close to the geographical centre of the town (surrounded by the High Crosshill, Stonelaw, Clincarthill and Quigleys residential neighbourhoods as well the local health centre), it is easily accessible to residents from many parts of the town and is thus fairly well used at most times.

The park was laid out on land donated to the Burgh in 1904 by Lord Overtoun, whose White's Chemical Works also ruined much of the area by reckless dumping of their toxic byproduct. Around the same time he made a similar donation for a park in Dalmuir near his family home, Overtoun House (both today in West Dunbartonshire), which initially had the same name and is bounded by Overtoun Road but is now known simply as Dalmuir Park.

Rutherglen's Overtoun Park, the landscaped part of which –  in area – is roughly square-shaped with entrances at each corner but with the north-west corner on a much higher elevation than the others, was once the location of much of the annual Landemer Day fair and parade celebrations (early June), now confined to the Main Street. It was briefly one of the City of Glasgow District Parks when Rutherglen was under Glasgow rule from 1975 to 1996.

The Category B listed cast iron drinking fountain in the park, created by the Saracen Foundry in northern Glasgow was erected in 1897 to mark Queen Victoria's Diamond Jubilee (not all commissioned fountains from the era survived into the 21st century, although near-identical models can still be found at various locations in the British Isles, and as far afield as Tazmania, Jamaica and South Africa). It was originally located at the western end of Rutherglen Main Street at 'the Gushet' but was moved to the park in 1911 as it had become an obstacle to the increasingly popular motor car.

The ornate bandstand (1914, also from the Saracen Foundry, similar in design to a number of surviving examples across Britain, and a very similar one in Elder Park, Adelaide, Australia) is also Category B listed. It was initially sited at the west side of the park surrounded by flowerbeds until it was removed in the late 1980s for the dual purpose of being used at the 1988 Glasgow Garden Festival, and to create space for the transformation of Mill Street into a dual carriageway (A730), which also involved the acquisition of a strip of land from the park and the repositioning of its ornamental iron and stone north-west gates (its third listed feature). The roadworks were completed in 1994, by which time the bandstand had been re-sited on a grass area in the centre of the park; it has since fallen into some disrepair due to a lack of use and maintenance; in 2021 it was estimated that a six-figure sum would be required to fully restore it.

The main children's play area towards the southern end of the park was extensively refurbished and extended in the 2010s, although the basketball hoop and red 'play train' further uphill became dilapidated and were removed. National Cycle Route 756 runs through the park via its tree-lined north-south footpath. Some other original recreational features (mostly within the flatter eastern sector which was formally Rutherglen Public Park set aside for sport while Overtoun Park was the more landscaped western part) are also no longer present: its red blaes football pitches disappeared entirely in the late 1980s with a care home built upon them – reducing this part of the park to  – and while the BMX tracks have been maintained, the adjacent tennis courts were neglected and eventually turfed over by the turn of the 21st century; in 2020, proposals were made by the Burnside-based Rutherglen Tennis Club to have these restored and roofed to attract players during the winter, however this in itself was controversial as it would involve a portion of the land being transferred to a private company. The plans received planning approval from the council despite some local objection, but then stalled in 2022 when expected funding from the sport's governing bodies did not materialise.

The environmental charity Grow73 have their base between the lawn bowling greens (operated as a standalone club with the public-access greens no longer in use) and the BMX tracks, and they have been involved in several projects to improve its appearance and horticultural aspects, including a community garden within the park; there is also a Friends of Overtoun Park volunteer group with similar aims in respect of its facilities and play features.

See also
 List of listed buildings in Rutherglen, South Lanarkshire

References

External links

Urban public parks in the United Kingdom
Parks in South Lanarkshire
Rutherglen
1904 establishments in Scotland
Bandstands in Scotland